Glossidionophora is a genus of parasitic flies in the family Tachinidae. There is one described species in Glossidionophora, G. nigra.

References

Further reading

 
 
 
 

Tachinidae
Monotypic Brachycera genera
Taxa named by Jacques-Marie-Frangile Bigot
Articles created by Qbugbot